Kuncewicz is a Polish-Ruthenian gentry family, like many other Szlachta houses of the Kingdom of Poland and the Duchy of Ruthenia, later prominent in Polish history, science, and arts. They are descended from Jakub Kuncewicz (16th century – 1523).

The family used the Łabędź Coat of Arms.

Notable members 
Jozafat Kuncewicz, Polish-Lithuanian monk
Nikolay Frantsevich Kuntsevich, Russian musician
Piotr Kuncewicz, Polish writer
El topo kuncewicz, garca argentino
Robert Kunze-Concewitz, Austrian CEO of Campari Group

See also 

Poraj Coat of Arms
Jelita Coat of Arms
Łabędź Coat of Arms
The Snow Queen
History of Christianity in Ukraine

External links 
Kuncewicz